Peter Berkos (born August 15, 1922) is an American former sound editor. He received the Special Achievement Academy Award during the 1975 Academy Awards for the film The Hindenburg. This was for the Sound Editing of the film. In 1996 he received the Lifetime Achievement award at the Motion Picture Sound Editors awards. He also did the sound effects for the original Battlestar Galactica, as well as the TV movies of Buck Rogers in the 25th Century.

Berkos retired from editing in 1987, but reinvented himself as a novelist, with books published in 2007 in 2013. He lives in Rancho Bernardo, California, and turned 100 on August 15, 2022.

Selected filmography
The Four Seasons (1981)
Gray Lady Down (1978)
Slap Shot (1977)
Car Wash (1976)
The Great Waldo Pepper (1975)
The Hindenburg (1975)
Tammy and the Bachelor (1957)
The Creature Walks Among Us (1957)
Angels with Dirty Faces (1938)

References

External links
 

1922 births
Living people
Best Sound Editing Academy Award winners
People from Illinois
American sound editors
Special Achievement Academy Award winners
Men centenarians
American centenarians
Columbia College Chicago alumni